Vehari District (Urdu and ) is a district in the Punjab province of Pakistan. The city of Vehari is the capital of district while Burewala is the largest city of the district.

Administrative divisions
The district of Vehari is administratively subdivided into three tehsils:

 Burewala
 Mailsi
 Vehari

and three subtehsils:
 Gaggo
 Karam Pur
 Jallah Jeem

History 
The district was created on 1 July 1976 out of the three tehsils of Multan District (Vehari, Burewala and Mailsi). The name Vehari means low-lying settlement by a flood water channel. The district lies along the right bank of the river Sutlej, which forms its southern boundary.

Demographics
At the time of the 2017 census the district had a population of 2,902,081, of which 1,463,796 were males and 1,437,989 females. Rural population is 2,395,952 while the urban population is 506,129. The literacy rate was 55.36%. Muslims were the predominant religious community with 99.31% of the population while Christians were 0.65% of the population.

At the time of the 2017 census, 74.69% of the population spoke Punjabi, 19.18% Saraiki and 5.12% Urdu as their first language.

Geography 

Agriculture 
141,000 acres of area was growing maize in 2015-16, increasing to 309,000 acres in 2019-20. The total production of maize stood at 428,000 tonnes in 2015-16, and rose to 1.1 million tonnes in 2019-20.

Notable people
Mohammad Irfan, cricketer
Ch. Nazir Ahmed Jatt, politician
Tufail Mohammad of Punjab Regiment (Pakistan), recipient of Nishan-e-Haider
Saleem Sherwani, hockey player
Waqar Younis, cricketer

References

External links
 
Vehari's satellite map

 

 
Districts of Punjab, Pakistan